Daddy's Success is a 1964 Norwegian comedy film written and directed by Arne Skouen, starring Sølvi Wang and Henki Kolstad. Laffen (Kolstad) has lost the respect of his children, and needs to restore his honour.

External links
 
 

1964 films
1964 comedy films
Films directed by Arne Skouen
Norwegian comedy films
1960s Norwegian-language films